Zabit (Arabic: ضابط; Russian: Забит) is a central-Asian masculine surname of Arabic origin. It may refer to:
Zabit Magomedsharipov (born 1991), Russian mixed martial artist of Avar ethnicity
Zabit Samedov (born 1984), Azerbaijani kickboxer

See also
Sabit

Arabic masculine given names